Urozhay is a rural locality (a village) in Tavtimanovsky Selsoviet, Iglinsky District, Bashkortostan, Russia. The population was 40 as of 2010.

Geography 
Urozhay is located 28 km northeast of Iglino (the district's administrative centre) by road. Spasskoye is the nearest rural locality.

References 

Rural localities in Iglinsky District